Olta Xhaçka (born 25 December 1979) is an Albanian politician and Socialist Party member of Parliament. She has been the Minister of Europe and Foreign Affairs since January 2021. She served as Albanian Minister of Social Welfare and Youth between March 2017 to August 2017 and as Minister of Defense from September 2017 to December 2020.

Education and career
She received a bachelor's in Political Science and International Relations from Clark University with honors, along with an MPA.

Since 2009, Xhaçka is part of the Socialist Party Parliamentary Group, initially as a representative of the region of Korça, throughout two legislatures.

Prior to her engagement into politics, Ms. Xhaçka has been actively involved in civil society, in the field of human rights and good governance. She has also worked for three years as a lecturer of political sciences at the University of New York Tirana.

As an activist of human rights, mainly in the field of gender equality and acting as the Chair of the Socialist Woman's Forum, Ms. Xhaçka, since 2014, has chaired the Minors Issues, Gender Equality and Domestic Violence Sub-committee. She also has been a member of the Work, Social Issues and Health Committee and member of the International Affairs Parliamentary Committee.

Ms. Xhaçka is a member of the Socialist Party Chairmanship and Chair of the Socialist Woman's Forum, since 2010. She also chaired the Qemal Stafa Foundation from 2015 until 2017 upon her appointment in the Albanian government.

Minister of Social Welfare and Youth
In March 2017, Ms. Xhaçka was appointed Minister of Social Welfare and Youth. She served in this role for only a few months, until the ministry was dissolved in August 2017 and absorbed by other ministries.

Minister of Defence

She was re-elected to parliament in June 2017, this time in Tirana. Her district had the greatest increase in votes for the Socialist Party since the 2013 parliamentary elections of any in Tirana.

In September 2017 she took the office of the Minister of Defence in the 2nd Rama Government, making her the second woman to be appointed to that office after Mimi Kodheli.

In April 2018 she met U.S. Secretary of Defense Jim Mattis at the Pentagon where Mattis reaffirmed "the strong defense relationship between the United States and Albania."

Minister of Foreign Affairs
In January 2021, Olta Xhacka was appointed as the new Foreign minister of  Albania after the resignation of the Acting Minister, Gent Cakaj from the office.

As Foreign Minister, she presided over the resettlement of Afghan refugees into Albania following the Taliban takeover of Afghanistan in August 2021. During her tenure as foreign minister, Albania has also taken a seat on the UN Security Council for the first time in its history.

Personal life
She is married to Artan Gaçi, who also served as a Socialist MP and they have a daughter, Hana.

References

External links

 Ministria e Mbrojtjes

|-

|-

1979 births
Living people
21st-century Albanian politicians
21st-century Albanian women politicians
Clark University alumni
Defence ministers of Albania
Female defence ministers
Female foreign ministers
Foreign ministers of Albania
Politicians from Tirana
Socialist Party of Albania politicians
Government ministers of Albania
Women government ministers of Albania
Members of the Parliament of Albania
Women members of the Parliament of Albania